"Get Right" is a song by Jennifer Lopez from her 2005 album Rebirth.

Get Right may also refer to:

Music
 "Get Right", a song by Jimmy Eat World from Integrity Blues
 Get Right, a 2013 album by The Soft White Sixties
 "Get Right", a song by Young Jeezy from his 2012 mixtape It's tha World
 "Get Right", a song by Pearl Jam from the 2002 album Riot Act
 "Get Right", a song by Bobby Parker	 
 "Get Right", a 2013 song by Miles Kane
 "Get Right", a 1967 song by The Players

Other uses
 Christopher "GeT_RiGhT" Alesund, Swedish professional Counter-Strike player
 GetRight, a shareware download manager

See also
 Get Right with the Man, a 2005 album by Van Zant